Kevin Fegan (born 1957 in Shirebrook, Derbyshire UK) is a playwright and poet.

Fegan received a commission for a play centred around former MP Dennis Skinner, entitled The Palace of Varieties – life and times of Dennis Skinner, performed at Derby Theatre in early 2022.

Fegan has written to commission around 50 original plays for a wide variety of theatre. 
Commissions for previous productions included The Ruck (play about girls' rugby league) at Lawrence Batley Theatre then national tour, Down The Line (site-specific play for Barrow Hill Railway Roundhouse featuring The Flying Scotsman and Stephenson's Rocket) and Bess - the Commoner Queen (about Bess of Hardwick) opening at The Guildhall Theatre Derby then also commencing on a national tour.

Theatre
Obama the Mamba, about Barack Obama's Kenyan brother, George Hussein Obama (loosely adapted from George's autobiography with Damien Lewis), was a co-production for Curve Theatre Leicester and The Lowry Salford and was Nominated Best New Play Manchester Theatre Awards 2012.
Fegan's other recent plays for The Lowry Salford include Slave (from the book by Mende Nazer & Damien Lewis) produced by Feelgood Theatre at The Lowry in 2010, followed by a national tour in 2011 (Winner Pete Postlethwaite Best New Play Manchester Theatre Awards 2010 and Winner Best Play or Film Human Trafficking Foundation 2011);
Fireflies: a love story waiting to happen commissioned & produced by The Lowry (nominated Best New Play Manchester Evening News Theatre Awards 2010); a studio play, The Forest (2008); adaptations of Love on the Dole (nominated Best Special Entertainment M.E.N. Theatre Awards 2004) and Oh Wot A Lovely War (2006), both commissioned & produced by The Lowry.

His early stage plays for Contact Theatre Manchester include McAlpine’s Fusilier (a verse play about the Irish in Britain 1988, nominated Best New Play Manchester Evening News Theatre Awards); Excess XS (the first stage play about the rave scene, in verse, 1992 Winner Best New Play in UK Regions Plays International) and Strange Attractors: love in a virtual world (the first stage play about virtual reality 1994 Winner Best New Play in UK Regions Plays International). Other early plays include Private Times for The Library Theatre Manchester (nominated Best New Play M.E.N. Theatre Awards 1990) & in 1999 performed by prisoners and staff at H.M.Prison Grendon and Rule 43 (British prisons tour 1989 & 90, nominated Best New Play M.E.N. Theatre Awards 1989) and the community play for Moss Side/Hulme in 1993 Game Challenge Level 7 (N.I.A.Centre & Contact Theatre).

His large-scale site-specific work includes Lord Dynamite (co-written with John Fox), a Welfare State International production for L.I.F.T.’91, The Clay Man at Upper Campfield Market Manchester (a Manchester City of Drama 1994 production and Woolaton Park Nottingham (a Newartswork commission), Seven-Tenths for Walk the Plank Theatre Ship (British tour by sea, nominated Best Special Entertainment M.E.N. Theatre Awards 1996), 52 Degrees South(co-written & co-directed with Andy Farrell) at the Imperial War Museum North which was a Commonwealth Games Cultureshock production and Winner of Best New Play Manchester Evening News Theatre Awards 2002, Captured Live (Expo Leicester for Leicester Haymarket Theatre 2004) and Not Much Matches Mansfield (site-specific community play for Mansfield town centre 2013).

His devised work includes Quarantine's award-winning White Trash(with young unemployed men at Contact Theatre 2004 and EatEat (with refugees & asylum-seekers at Leicester Guildhall 2003 in association with Leicester Haymarket Theatre).

His plays for young people include Get Real (Blackpool Grand Theatre 2003), The Ghosts of Crime Lake (Oldham Coliseum Theatre 2005), When Frankenstein Came to Matlock (Mansfield Palace Theatre 2008), ABC123 and The Selkie Boy (Ashton Group at Forum 28 Theatre Barrow 2009 & 2010) and Wan2tlk? (Liverpool Everyman Theatre 2001 and published by Methuen Drama 2008).

He has written several dramas for BBC Radio 4, including 8 single plays, including a drama documentary in verse:In Denial: the story of Paul Blackburn), Blast (nominated for a Best Drama Sony Award 2001), a Classic Drama Serial In A Grove (starring Natasha McElhone) and a 3-week long Woman’s Hour Drama Serial The Furys (starring Brenda Fricker).

He has written a few short films, including Dancing in The Ruins (in collaboration with Granada TV and a N.W.Arts Film Award) screened at Kino Manchester & I.C.A. London). He has also worked as a storyline writer for Granada TV's Coronation Street.

Poetry, Print and Radio
Fegan has published 10 books of poetry and edited over a dozen anthologies. His poetry books include the dramatic poems: Matey Boy (commissioned by Welfare State International 1990 and published by Iron Press), which was performed by Kevin on two national tours; Blast a stage version of his B.B.C.Radio 4 verse drama at Contact Theatre which was a Manchester Poetry Festival Airport Commission in 2002; and Racer (BBC Radio 4, performed by Paul McGann 2003). Blast and Racer are published by Five Leaves. Let Your Left Hand Sing, was commissioned by The Long Journey Home Festival (a Commonwealth Games production 2002) and was re-published by Five Leaves Publications in 2008. His latest poetry collections are Away Pitch, a commissioned collection of poems about sports and arts, commissioned by The Brewhouse, Burton-on-Trent, as part of the Olympic Games Cultural Programme 2012, which won an Inspire Mark Award, and The Singing Tree, a commissioned collection about the diverse communities of Corby in the book, Our Corby 2012, published by Corby Community Arts.
Recent books as compiler/editor include Fabulous (published by participatory arts organization People Express in 2008, celebrating the women of South Derbyshire).
His poems have appeared in various magazines, including the New Statesman and Index on Censorship.

He has given hundreds of poetry performances at live literature venues and has been a featured poet on BBC Radio 4's Encyclopedia Poetica, ITV's international poetry series Word of Mouth, Granada TV's Celebration and BBC 3’s poetry series, Whine Gums.

References 

1957 births
Living people
British dramatists and playwrights
British male poets